Desmiphora intonsa is a species of beetle in the family Cerambycidae. It was described by Ernst Friedrich Germar in 1824. It is known from Argentina, Brazil, Paraguay, and Uruguay.

References

Desmiphora
Beetles described in 1824